Jairo Hernández may refer to: 

Jairo Hernández (cyclist) (b. 1972), Colombian road racing cyclist 
Jairo Hernández (footballer) (b. 1990), Peruvian football (soccer) player